Sphodromantis gracilis is a species of praying mantis native to southern Africa.

It is found in the Transvaal region of South Africa.

See also
African mantis
List of mantis genera and species

References

G
Mantodea of Africa
Insects of South Africa
Insects described in 1991